The Men's Shot Put F44 had its Final held on September 8 at 18:50.

Medalists

Results

References
Final

Athletics at the 2008 Summer Paralympics